Fredericks Goldman Jones was the name of a famous French musical trio made up of Jean-Jacques Goldman, Carole Fredericks and Michael Jones. Established in 1990, it remained active until 1996. After the amicable separation of the trio and the continuation of each in their solo musical careers, the three remained very close friends and continued to perform on special concerts together.

The trio released two hugely successful albums, the self-titled Fredericks Goldman Jones in 1990 and Rouge in 1993. The song "À nos actes manqués" remains their most famous song. Other famous songs include "Né en 17 à Leidenstadt", "Juste après" and "Nuit". The order of the names was decided strictly on an alphabetical order of the family names of the trio.

Roles
In the albums released by the trio, and despite the prominence of Jean-Jacques Goldman, Carole Fredericks and Michael Jones were involved as main singers and not as guitarist in case of Jones or backing vocalist in case of Fredericks as in earlier collaborations with Goldman. For example, "Il part" has the sole vocals of Carole Fredericks; Michael Jones, took part prominently in duo renditions for "Frères", most of "À nos actes manqués", whereas others are sung by all members of the trio like "Vivre cent vies", "Juste après", "Né en 17 à Leidenstadt", "Je l'aime aussi". Jean-Jacques Goldman due to his prominence as singer-songwriter sang solo in "Fermer les yeux" aided by a Bulgarian choir, or "Tu manques".

Most of the composition was to Jean-Jacques Goldman with the exception of a couple of songs with English lyrics that were co-written by the Welsh-born Michael Jones like "Nuit" or the English-language version of "À nos actes manqués". The trio also sang songs from the solo repertoire Goldman's solos albums including "Pas toi", "Il suffira d'un signe". Inversely Goldman used many of the trio songs in his solo concerts later on.

Discography

Albums
Studio Albums

Live Albums

Compilation album

Singles

References

French musical trios